The former First Church of Christ, Scientist is an historic Christian Science church building located at 635 Clyde Street, in the Shadyside section of Pittsburgh, Pennsylvania United States. Built in 1904, it was designed in the Classical Revival-style of architecture by noted Chicago architect Solon Spencer Beman.

In  1977, First Church of Christ, Scientist, was designated a Pittsburgh Historic Landmark by the Pittsburgh History and Landmarks Foundation.

The building was sold in 1992 to the University of Pittsburgh which has since renovated it for use as its University Child Development Center.

In 2005 First Church of Christ, Scientist, was determined by the city of Pittsburgh's Historic Review Commission and the Department of City planning to be eligible for listing on the National Register of Historic Places.

First Church of Christ, Scientist, now holds services at 201 North Dithridge at Bayard Street, in the Oakland section of Pittsburgh.

See also
List of former Christian Science churches, societies and buildings
First Church of Christ, Scientist (disambiguation)

References

Churches in Pittsburgh
Former Christian Science churches, societies and buildings in Pennsylvania
Churches completed in 1904
20th-century Christian Science church buildings
Pittsburgh History & Landmarks Foundation Historic Landmarks
Solon Spencer Beman church buildings
Neoclassical architecture in Pennsylvania
Neoclassical church buildings in the United States